This is a list of Olympic champions in men's water polo since the inaugural official edition in 1900.

Abbreviations

History
Men's water polo tournaments have been staged at the Olympic Games since 1900. Men's water polo was among the first team sports introduced at the modern Olympic Games in 1900. Seven European teams from four countries, including four from the host nation France, took part in the competition. The British team was the inaugural champion. At the 1904 Summer Olympics, a water polo tournament was contested, three club teams of seven players each entered. A German team tried to enter, but its entry was refused because the players did not play for the same club. The event took place in a pond in Forest Park, the location of both the Olympics and the World's Fair. Previously, the International Olympic Committee and International Swimming Federation (FINA) considered the water polo event at the 1904 Olympics as a demonstration sport. However, in July 2021, after accepting the recommendation of Olympic historian Bill Mallon, the IOC recognized water polo along with several others as an official sport of the 1904 Olympic program. Water polo was not played at the 1906 Olympics.

As of the 2020 Summer Olympics, men's water polo teams from ten European countries won all 27 official tournaments.

From 1908 to 1920, the Great Britain men's national water polo team won three consecutive gold medals at the Olympics, becoming the first team to have an Olympic winning streak in water polo.

Hungary is the most successful country in the men's Olympic water polo tournament, with nine Olympic gold medals. The team won three gold medals in a row between 2000 and 2008, becoming the second water polo team to have an Olympic winning streak.

Italy and Yugoslavia have both won three Olympic titles in men's water polo tournament.

The Serbia men's national team is current Olympic champion.

Legend

  – Debut
  – Champions
  – Olympic winning streak (winning three or more Olympic titles in a row)
  – Hosts
 Team† – Defunct team

Team statistics

Results

The following table shows results of Olympic champions in men's water polo by tournament. Last updated: 8 August 2021.

Legend
  – Winning 6 matches during the tournament
  – Drawing 4 matches during the tournament
  – Losing 2 matches during the tournament
  – Winning all matches during the tournament
  – Olympic winning streak (winning three or more Olympic titles in a row)
  – Host team
 Team† – Defunct team

Abbreviation

 MP – Matches played
 W – Won
 D – Drawn
 L – Lost
 GF – Goals for
 GA – Goals against
 GD – Goal difference
 GF/MP – Goals for per match
 GA/MP – Goals against per match
 GD/MP – Goal difference per match

Sources:
 Official Reports (PDF): 1900–1996 (men's tournaments);
 Official Results Books (PDF): 2000 (pp. 45–92), 2004 (p. 207), 2008 (p. 202), 2012 (p. 471), 2016 (p. 131), 2020 (p. 150);
 Olympedia: 1900–2020 (men's tournaments);
 Sports Reference: 1900–2016 (men's tournaments).

From 1900 to 1928, single-elimination tournaments were used to determine Olympic champions in men's water polo. The following table shows men's teams that won all matches during the Olympic tournament since 1932.

The following tables show records of goals for per match.

The following tables show records of goals against per match.

The following tables show records of goal difference per match.

Squads
The following table shows number of players and average age, height and weight of Olympic champions in men's water polo by tournament. Last updated: 30 August 2021.

Legend
  – Olympic winning streak
  – Winning all matches during the tournament
  – Host team
 Team† – Defunct team

Sources:
 Official Reports (PDF): 1900–1996 (men's tournaments);
 Official Results Books (PDF): 2000 (pp. 45–92), 2004 (p. 208), 2008 (p. 203), 2012 (p. 472), 2016 (p. 132), 2020 (p. 151);
 Olympedia: 1900–2020 (men's tournaments);
 Sports Reference: 1900–2016 (men's tournaments).

The following tables show records of the number of returning Olympians.

The following tables show records of average age.

The following tables show records of average height.

The following tables show records of average weight.

Olympic and world champions (teams)

The following table is pre-sorted by number of Olympic titles (in descending order), number of world titles (in descending order), name of the team (in ascending order), respectively. Last updated: 8 July 2022.

As of the 2020 Summer Olympics, there are seven men's national water polo teams that won gold medals at the Summer Olympics and the World Aquatics Championships.

Legend
 Year* – As host team
 Team† – Defunct team

Player statistics

Age records

The following tables show the oldest and youngest male Olympic champions in water polo. Last updated: 12 September 2021.

Legend
  – Host team

Multiple gold medalists

The following tables are pre-sorted by year of receiving the last Olympic gold medal (in ascending order), year of receiving the first Olympic gold medal (in ascending order), name of the player (in ascending order), respectively. Last updated: 12 September 2021.

Ten male athletes won three Olympic gold medals in water polo.

Legend
 Year* – As host team

Forty-one male athletes won two Olympic gold medals in water polo.

Legend
 Year* – As host team

Olympic and world champions (players)

The following tables are pre-sorted by number of Olympic titles (in descending order), number of world titles (in descending order), year of receiving the last gold medal (in ascending order), year of receiving the first gold medal (in ascending order), name of the player (in ascending order), respectively. Last updated: 12 September 2021.

As of the 2020 Summer Olympics, there are ninety-six male athletes who won gold medals in water polo at the Summer Olympics and the World Aquatics Championships.

Legend
 Year* – As host team

}

Olympic champion families
The following tables are pre-sorted by year of receiving the Olympic gold medal (in ascending order), name of the player (in ascending order), respectively. Last updated: 12 September 2021.

Legend
 Year* – As host team

Coach statistics

Most successful coaches

The following table is pre-sorted by number of Olympic gold medals (in descending order), year of winning the last Olympic gold medal (in ascending order), name of the coach (in ascending order), respectively. Last updated: 12 September 2021.

There are four coaches who led men's national water polo teams to win two or more Olympic gold medals.

Ratko Rudić is the most successful water polo coach in Olympic history. As a head coach, he led three men's national water polo teams to win four Olympic gold medals. He guided Yugoslavia men's national team to two consecutive gold medals in 1984 and 1988, Italy men's national team to a gold medal in 1992, and Croatia men's national team to a gold medal in 2012, making him the first and only coach to lead three different men's national water polo teams to the Olympic titles.

Dénes Kemény of Hungary is another coach who led men's national water polo team(s) to win three Olympic gold medals. Under his leadership, the Hungary men's national team won three gold in a row between 2000 and 2008, becoming the second water polo team to have an Olympic winning streak.

Béla Rajki coached the Hungary men's national team to two consecutive Olympic gold medals in 1952 and 1956.

Dejan Savić led Serbia men's national team to win two consecutive Olympic gold medals in 2016 and 2021.

Legend
 Year* – As host team

Champions as coach and player
The following table is pre-sorted by number of Olympic gold medals (in descending order), year of winning the last Olympic gold medal (in ascending order), name of the person (in ascending order), respectively. Last updated: 12 September 2021.

Only one water polo player won an Olympic gold medal and then guided a men's national water polo team to the Olympic title as a head coach.

Dezső Gyarmati of Hungary won three Olympic gold medals in 1952–1956 and 1964. He coached the Hungary men's national team to a gold in 1976.

Legend
 Year* – As host team

Olympic and world champions (coaches)

The following table is pre-sorted by number of Olympic titles (in descending order), number of world titles (in descending order), year of winning the last gold medal (in ascending order), year of winning the first gold medal (in ascending order), name of the coach (in ascending order), respectively. Last updated: 12 September 2021.

As of the 2020 Summer Olympics, there are six head coaches who led men's national teams to win gold medals in water polo at the Summer Olympics and the World Aquatics Championships.

Legend
 Year* – As host team

Champions by tournament

2020 (Serbia, 2nd title)
* Edition of men's tournament: 28th
 Host city:  Tokyo, Japan
 Number of participating teams: 12
 Competition format: Round-robin pools advanced teams to classification matches
 Champion:  (2nd title; 3rd place in preliminary B group)

Source: Official Results Books (PDF): 2020 (pp. 22, 28, 48, 54, 68, 76, 88, 96).

 Head coach:  Dejan Savić (2nd title as head coach)
 Assistant coaches:  Stefan Ćirić,  Vladimir Vujasinović

Note: Duško Pijetlović and Gojko Pijetlović are brothers.
Sources:
 Official Results Books (PDF): 2020 (p. 151);
 ISHOF.

Abbreviation

 MP – Matches played
 Min – Minutes
 Avg min – Average minutes
 G – Goals
 Sh – Shots
 TF – Turnover fouls
 ST – Steals
 RB – Rebounds
 BL – Blocked shots
 SP – Sprints

Abbreviation

 CP – Centre forward position exclusion
 FP – Field exclusion
 DS – Driving situation exclusion
 M6 – Exclusion in 6 metre free throw situation
 CS – Counter attacking situation exclusion
 DE – Double exclusion
 Pen – Penalty foul
 EX – Exclusions with substitution

Source: Official Results Books (PDF): 2020 (p. 150).

2016 (Serbia, 1st title)
* Edition of men's tournament: 27th
 Host city:  Rio de Janeiro, Brazil
 Number of participating teams: 12
 Competition format: Round-robin pools advanced teams to classification matches
 Champion:  (1st title; 4th place in preliminary A group)

Source: Official Results Books (PDF): 2016 (pp. 9, 21, 37, 53, 65, 75, 83, 91).

 Head coach:  Dejan Savić (1st title as head coach)
 Assistant coaches:  Stefan Ćirić,  Vladimir Vujasinović

Note: Duško Pijetlović and Gojko Pijetlović are brothers.
Sources:
 Official Results Books (PDF): 2016 (p. 132);
 ISHOF.

Abbreviation

 MP – Matches played
 Min – Minutes
 G – Goals
 Sh – Shots
 AS – Assists
 TF – Turnover fouls
 ST – Steals
 BL – Blocked shots
 SP – Sprints
 20S – 20 seconds exclusion
 DE – Double exclusion
 Pen – Penalty
 EX – Exclusion

Source: Official Results Books (PDF): 2016 (p. 131).

2012 (Croatia, 1st title)
* Edition of men's tournament: 26th
 Host city:  London, United Kingdom
 Number of participating teams: 12
 Competition format: Round-robin pools advanced teams to classification matches
 Champion:  (1st title; 1st place in preliminary A group)

Source: Official Results Books (PDF): 2012 (pp. 373, 391, 399, 415, 421, 433, 445, 455).

 Head coach:  Ratko Rudić (4th title as head coach)
 Assistant coaches:  Elvis Fatović,  Vjekoslav Kobešćak

Sources:
 Official Results Books (PDF): 2012 (p. 472);
 ISHOF.

Abbreviation

 MP – Matches played
 Min – Minutes
 G – Goals
 Sh – Shots
 AS – Assists
 TF – Turnover fouls
 ST – Steals
 BL – Blocked shots
 SP – Sprints
 20S – 20 seconds exclusion
 DE – Double exclusion
 Pen – Penalty
 EX – Exclusion

Source: Official Results Books (PDF): 2012 (p. 471).

2008 (Hungary, 9th title)
* Edition of men's tournament: 25th
 Host city:  Beijing, China
 Number of participating teams: 12
 Competition format: Round-robin pools advanced teams to classification matches
 Champion:  (9th title; 1st place in preliminary A group)

Source: Official Results Books (PDF): 2008 (pp. 84, 92, 94, 104, 106, 156, 168).

 Head coach:  Dénes Kemény (3rd title as head coach)
 Assistant coach:  Csaba Mátéfalvy

Note: Dániel Varga and Dénes Varga are brothers.
Sources:
 Official Results Books (PDF): 2008 (p. 203);
 ISHOF.

Abbreviation

 MP – Matches played
 Min – Minutes
 G – Goals
 Sh – Shots
 AS – Assists
 TF – Turnover fouls
 ST – Steals
 BL – Blocked shots
 SP – Sprints
 20S – 20 seconds exclusion
 Pen – Penalty
 EX – Exclusion

Source: Official Results Books (PDF): 2008 (p. 202).

2004 (Hungary, 8th title)
* Edition of men's tournament: 24th
 Host city:  Athens, Greece
 Number of participating teams: 12
 Competition format: Round-robin pools advanced teams to classification matches
 Champion:  (8th title; 1st place in preliminary A group)

Source: Official Results Books (PDF): 2004 (pp. 93, 101, 105, 109, 116, 164, 173).

 Head coach:  Dénes Kemény (2nd title as head coach)
 Assistant coach:  Csaba Mátéfalvy

Note: Ádám Steinmetz and Barnabás Steinmetz are brothers.
Sources:
 Official Results Books (PDF): 2004 (p. 208);
 ISHOF.

Abbreviation

 MP – Matches played
 Min – Minutes
 G – Goals
 Sh – Shots
 AS – Assists
 TF – Turnover fouls
 ST – Steals
 BL – Blocked shots
 SP – Sprints
 20S – 20 seconds exclusion
 Pen – Penalty
 EX – Exclusion

Source: Official Results Books (PDF): 2004 (p. 207).

2000 (Hungary, 7th title)
* Edition of men's tournament: 23rd
 Host city:  Sydney, Australia
 Number of participating teams: 12
 Competition format: Round-robin pools advanced teams to classification matches
 Champion:  (7th title; 3rd place in preliminary B group)

Source: Official Results Books (PDF): 2000 (pp. 45, 50, 55, 78, 81, 84, 87, 90).

 Head coach:  Dénes Kemény (1st title as head coach)

Sources:
 Official Results Books (PDF): 2000 (pp. 45, 50, 55, 78, 81, 84, 87, 90);
 Olympedia: 2000 (men's tournament);
 ISHOF.

Abbreviation

 MP – Matches played
 Min – Minutes
 G – Goals
 Sh – Shots
 AS – Assists
 TF – Turnover fouls
 ST – Steals
 BL – Blocked shots
 SP – Sprints
 20S – 20 seconds exclusion
 Pen – Penalty
 EX – Exclusion

Source: Official Results Books (PDF): 2000 (pp. 45, 50, 55, 78, 81, 84, 87, 90).

1996 (Spain, 1st title)
* Edition of men's tournament: 22nd
 Host city:  Atlanta, United States
 Number of participating teams: 12
 Competition format: Round-robin pools advanced teams to classification matches
 Champion:  (1st title; 3rd place in preliminary A group)

Source: Official Reports (PDF): 1996 (p. 57, 58, 59, 60, 61, 70, 71, 73).

 Head coach:  Juan Jané (1st title as head coach)
 Assistant coach:  Santiago Fernandez de Cuevas

Sources:
 Official Reports (PDF): 1996 (p. 57, 58, 59, 60, 61, 70, 71, 73);
 Olympedia: 1996 (men's tournament);
 Sports Reference: 1996 (men's tournament);
 ISHOF.

Source: Official Reports (PDF): 1996 (p. 57, 58, 59, 60, 61, 70, 71, 73).

1992 (Italy, 3rd title)
* Edition of men's tournament: 21st
 Host city:  Barcelona, Spain
 Number of participating teams: 12
 Competition format: Round-robin pools advanced teams to classification matches
 Champion:  (3rd title; 2nd place in preliminary B group)

Source: Official Reports (PDF): 1992 (pp. 391, 392, 393, 394, 395, 399, 400).

 Head coach:  Ratko Rudić (3rd title as head coach)
 Assistant coach:  Giuseppe Castellucci

Note: Francesco Porzio and Pino Porzio are brothers.
Sources:
 Official Reports (PDF): 1992 (pp. 391, 392, 393, 394, 395, 399, 400);
 Olympedia: 1992 (men's tournament);
 Sports Reference: 1992 (men's tournament);
 ISHOF.

Source: Official Reports (PDF): 1992 (pp. 391, 392, 393, 394, 395, 399, 400).

1988 (Yugoslavia, 3rd title)
* Edition of men's tournament: 20th
 Host city:  Seoul, South Korea
 Number of participating teams: 12
 Competition format: Round-robin pools advanced teams to classification matches
 Champion:  (3rd title; 1st place in preliminary B group)

Source: Official Reports (PDF): 1988 (pp. 593, 594, 595, 597).

 Head coach:  Ratko Rudić (2nd title as head coach)

Sources:
 Official Reports (PDF): 1988 (pp. 593, 594, 595, 597);
 Olympedia: 1988 (men's tournament);
 Sports Reference: 1988 (men's tournament);
 ISHOF.

1984 (Yugoslavia, 2nd title)
* Edition of men's tournament: 19th
 Host city:  Los Angeles, United States
 Number of participating teams: 12
 Competition format: Round-robin pools advanced teams to the round-robin final pool
 Champion:  (2nd title; 1st place in preliminary A group; 1st place in final D group)

Source: Official Reports (PDF): 1984 (pp. 528, 529, 530, 531, 532, 533).

 Head coach:  Ratko Rudić (1st title as head coach)

Sources:
 Official Reports (PDF): 1984 (pp. 528, 529, 530, 531, 532, 533);
 Olympedia: 1984 (men's tournament);
 Sports Reference: 1984 (men's tournament);
 ISHOF.

1980 (Soviet Union, 2nd title)
* Edition of men's tournament: 18th
 Host city:  Moscow, Soviet Union
 Number of participating teams: 12
 Competition format: Round-robin pools advanced teams to the round-robin final pool
 Champion:  (2nd title; 1st place in preliminary A group; 1st place in final A group)

Source: Official Reports (PDF): 1980 (pp. 497, 500, 501, 502).

 Head coach:  Boris Popov (1st title as head coach)

Sources:
 Official Reports (PDF): 1980 (pp. 497, 500, 501, 502);
 Olympedia: 1980 (men's tournament);
 Sports Reference: 1980 (men's tournament);
 ISHOF.

1976 (Hungary, 6th title)
* Edition of men's tournament: 17th
 Host city:  Montreal, Canada
 Number of participating teams: 12
 Competition format: Round-robin pools advanced teams to the round-robin final pool
 Champion:  (6th title; 1st place in preliminary C group; 1st place in final E group)

Source: Official Reports (PDF): 1976 (pp. 487, 489, 491, 492).

 Head coach:  Dezső Gyarmati (1st title as head coach)

Sources:
 Official Reports (PDF): 1976 (pp. 487, 489, 491, 492);
 Olympedia: 1976 (men's tournament);
 Sports Reference: 1976 (men's tournament);
 ISHOF.

1972 (Soviet Union, 1st title)
* Edition of men's tournament: 16th
 Host city:  Munich, West Germany
 Number of participating teams: 16
 Competition format: Round-robin pools advanced teams to the round-robin final pool
 Champion:  (1st title; 1st place in preliminary C group; 1st place in final I group)

Source: Official Reports (PDF): 1972 (pp. 358, 359, 363, 364, 365).

 Head coach:  Vladimir Semyonov (1st title as head coach)

Sources:
 Official Reports (PDF): 1972 (pp. 358, 359, 363, 364, 365);
 Olympedia: 1972 (men's tournament);
 Sports Reference: 1972 (men's tournament);
 ISHOF.

1968 (Yugoslavia, 1st title)
* Edition of men's tournament: 15th
 Host city:  Mexico City, Mexico
 Number of participating teams: 15
 Competition format: Round-robin pools advanced teams to classification matches
 Champion:  (1st title; 2nd place in preliminary B group)

Source: Official Reports (PDF): 1968 (pp. 812, 814, 816, 817, 819, 822, 824, 826).

 Head coach:  Aleksandar Sajfert (1st title as head coach)

Sources:
 Official Reports (PDF): 1968 (pp. 812, 814, 816, 817, 819, 822, 824, 826);
 Olympedia: 1968 (men's tournament);
 Sports Reference: 1968 (men's tournament);
 ISHOF.

1964 (Hungary, 5th title)
* Edition of men's tournament: 14th
 Host city:  Tokyo, Japan
 Number of participating teams: 13
 Competition format: Round-robin pools advanced teams to the round-robin semi-final pool; round-robin semi-final pools advanced teams to the round-robin final pool
 Champion:  (5th title; 1st place in preliminary D group; 2nd place in semi-final B group; 1st place in final group)

Source: Official Reports (PDF): 1964 (pp. 685, 687, 691, 694, 695, 698).

 Head coach:  Károly Laky (1st title as head coach)

Sources:
 Official Reports (PDF): 1964 (pp. 685, 687, 691, 694, 695, 698);
 Olympedia: 1964 (men's tournament);
 Sports Reference: 1964 (men's tournament);
 ISHOF.

1960 (Italy, 2nd title)
* Edition of men's tournament: 13th
 Host city:  Rome, Italy
 Number of participating teams: 16
 Competition format: Round-robin pools advanced teams to the round-robin semi-final pool; round-robin semi-final pools advanced teams to the round-robin final pool
 Champion:  (2nd title; 1st place in preliminary A group; 1st place in semi-final A group; 1st place in final group)

Source: Official Reports (PDF): 1960 (pp. 618, 619, 627, 628, 631).

 Head coach:  Andres Zolyomy (1st title as head coach)

Sources:
 Official Reports (PDF): 1960 (pp. 618, 619, 627, 628, 631);
 Olympedia: 1960 (men's tournament);
 Sports Reference: 1960 (men's tournament);
 ISHOF.

1956 (Hungary, 4th title)
* Edition of men's tournament: 12th
 Host city:  Melbourne, Australia
 Number of participating teams: 10
 Competition format: Round-robin pools advanced teams to the round-robin final pool
 Champion:  (4th title; 1st place in preliminary B group; 1st place in final group)

Source: Official Reports (PDF): 1956 (pp. 625, 626).

 Head coach:  Béla Rajki (2nd title as head coach)

Sources:
 Official Reports (PDF): 1956 (pp. 625, 626);
 Olympedia: 1956 (men's tournament);
 Sports Reference: 1956 (men's tournament);
 ISHOF.

1952 (Hungary, 3rd title)
* Edition of men's tournament: 11th
 Host city:  Helsinki, Finland
 Number of participating teams: 21
 Competition format: Single-elimination tournament qualifying; round-robin pools advanced teams to the round-robin semi-final pool; round-robin semi-final pools advanced teams to the round-robin final pool
 Champion:  (3rd title; 1st place in preliminary B group; 1st place in semi-final F group; 1st place in final group)

Source: Official Reports (PDF): 1952 (pp. 602, 603, 606, 607, 608).

 Head coach:  Béla Rajki (1st title as head coach)

Sources:
 Official Reports (PDF): 1952 (pp. 602, 603, 606, 607, 608);
 Olympedia: 1952 (men's tournament);
 Sports Reference: 1952 (men's tournament);
 ISHOF.

1948 (Italy, 1st title)
* Edition of men's tournament: 10th
 Host city:  London, United Kingdom
 Number of participating teams: 18
 Competition format: Series of round-robin elimination pools, followed by round-robin semi-final pools, and then round-robin final pools
 Champion:  (1st title; 1st place in round one D group; 1st place in round two I group; 1st place in semi-final L group; 1st place in final group)

Source: Official Reports (PDF): 1948 (pp. 643, 645, 646).

 Head coach:  Giuseppe Valle (1st title as head coach)

Note: Gianfranco Pandolfini and Tullio Pandolfini are brothers.
Sources:
 Official Reports (PDF): 1948 (pp. 643, 645, 646);
 Olympedia: 1948 (men's tournament);
 Sports Reference: 1948 (men's tournament);
 ISHOF.

1936 (Hungary, 2nd title)
* Edition of men's tournament: 9th
 Host city:  Berlin, Germany
 Number of participating teams: 16
 Competition format: Round-robin pools advanced teams to the round-robin semi-final pool; round-robin semi-final pools advanced teams to the round-robin final pool
 Champion:  (2nd title; 1st place in preliminary II group; 1st place in semi-final I group; 1st place in final group)

Source: Official Reports (PDF): 1936 (pp. 347, 349, 355).

 Head coach: 

Sources:
 Official Reports (PDF): 1936 (pp. 347, 349, 355);
 Olympedia: 1936 (men's tournament);
 Sports Reference: 1936 (men's tournament);
 ISHOF.

1932 (Hungary, 1st title)

 Edition of men's tournament: 8th
 Host city:  Los Angeles, United States
 Number of participating teams: 5
 Competition format: Round-robin tournament
 Champion:  (1st title)

Source: Official Reports (PDF): 1932 (pp. 646, 649, 650).

 Head coach: 

Note: Alajos Keserű and Ferenc Keserű are brothers.
Sources:
 Official Reports (PDF): 1932 (pp. 646, 649, 650);
 Olympedia: 1932 (men's tournament);
 Sports Reference: 1932 (men's tournament);
 ISHOF.

1928 (Germany, 1st title)
* Edition of men's tournament: 7th
 Host city:  Amsterdam, Netherlands
 Number of participating teams: 14
 Competition format: Single-elimination tournament; Bergvall system for third-place
 Champion:  (1st title)

Source: Official Reports (PDF): 1928 (pp. 803, 804, 806).

 Head coach: 

Note: Erich Rademacher and Joachim Rademacher are brothers.
Sources:
 Official Reports (PDF): 1928 (pp. 803, 804, 806);
 Olympedia: 1928 (men's tournament);
 Sports Reference: 1928 (men's tournament);
 ISHOF.

1924 (France, 1st title)

 Edition of men's tournament: 6th
 Host city:  Paris, France
 Number of participating teams: 13
 Competition format: Single-elimination tournament; Bergvall system for second- and third-place
 Champion:  (1st title)

Source: Official Reports (PDF): 1924 (pp. 488, 490, 492).

 Head coach: 

Sources:
 Official Reports (PDF): 1924 (pp. 488, 490, 492);
 Olympedia: 1924 (men's tournament);
 Sports Reference: 1924 (men's tournament);
 ISHOF.

1920 (Great Britain, 4th title)
* Edition of men's tournament: 5th
 Host city:  Antwerp, Belgium
 Number of participating teams: 12
 Competition format: Single-elimination tournament; Bergvall system for second- and third-place
 Champion:  (4th title)

Source: Official Reports (PDF): 1920 (p. 130).

 Head coach: 

Sources:
 Official Reports (PDF): 1920 (p. 130);
 Olympedia: 1920 (men's tournament);
 Sports Reference: 1920 (men's tournament);
 ISHOF.

1912 (Great Britain, 3rd title)

 Edition of men's tournament: 4th
 Host city:  Stockholm, Sweden
 Number of participating teams: 6
 Competition format: Single-elimination tournament
 Champion:  (3rd title)

Source: Official Reports (PDF): 1912 (pp. 1022, 1024, 1033).

 Head coach: 

Sources:
 Official Reports (PDF): 1912 (pp. 1022, 1024, 1033);
 Olympedia: 1912 (men's tournament);
 Sports Reference: 1912 (men's tournament);
 ISHOF.

1908 (Great Britain, 2nd title)
* Edition of men's tournament: 3rd
 Host city:  London, United Kingdom
 Number of participating teams: 4
 Competition format: Single-elimination tournament
 Champion:  (2nd title)

Source: Official Reports (PDF): 1908 (pp. 360, 361).

 Head coach: 

Sources:
 Official Reports (PDF): 1908 (pp. 360, 361);
 Olympedia: 1908 (men's tournament);
 Sports Reference: 1908 (men's tournament);
 ISHOF.

1904 (unofficial program)
 Edition of men's tournament: 2nd (unofficial program)
 Host city:  St. Louis, United States
 Number of participating teams: 3 teams from the United States
 Competition format: Single-elimination tournament
 Champion: New York Athletic Club

1900 (Great Britain, 1st title)
* Edition of men's tournament: 1st
 Host city:  Paris, France
 Number of participating teams: 7 teams from 4 countries, including 4 from France
 Competition format: Single-elimination tournament
 Champion: Osborne Swimming Club (1st title)

Sources:
 Olympedia: 1900 (men's tournament);
 Sports Reference: 1900 (men's tournament).

 Head coach: 

Sources:
 Olympedia: 1900 (men's tournament);
 Sports Reference: 1900 (men's tournament);
 ISHOF.

See also
 Water polo at the Summer Olympics

 Lists of Olympic water polo records and statistics
 List of men's Olympic water polo tournament records and statistics
 List of women's Olympic water polo tournament records and statistics
 List of Olympic champions in women's water polo
 National team appearances in the men's Olympic water polo tournament
 National team appearances in the women's Olympic water polo tournament
 List of players who have appeared in multiple men's Olympic water polo tournaments
 List of players who have appeared in multiple women's Olympic water polo tournaments
 List of Olympic medalists in water polo (men)
 List of Olympic medalists in water polo (women)
 List of men's Olympic water polo tournament top goalscorers
 List of women's Olympic water polo tournament top goalscorers
 List of men's Olympic water polo tournament goalkeepers
 List of women's Olympic water polo tournament goalkeepers
 List of Olympic venues in water polo

 List of world champions in men's water polo
 List of world champions in women's water polo

Notes

References

Sources

ISHOF

External links
 Olympic water polo – Official website

Men
.Champions, Men